The arrondissement of Mirande is an arrondissement of France in the Gers department in the Occitanie region. It has 165 communes.

Composition

The communes of the arrondissement of Mirande, and their INSEE codes, are:

 Aignan (32001)
 Arblade-le-Bas (32004)
 Armentieux (32008)
 Armous-et-Cau (32009)
 Arrouède (32010)
 Aujan-Mournède (32015)
 Aurensan (32017)
 Aussos (32468)
 Aux-Aussat (32020)
 Avéron-Bergelle (32022)
 Barcelonne-du-Gers (32027)
 Barcugnan (32028)
 Barran (32029)
 Bars (32030)
 Bassoues (32032)
 Bazugues (32034)
 Beaumarchés (32036)
 Beccas (32039)
 Bellegarde (32041)
 Belloc-Saint-Clamens (32042)
 Berdoues (32045)
 Bernède (32046)
 Betplan (32050)
 Bézues-Bajon (32053)
 Blousson-Sérian (32058)
 Boucagnères (32060)
 Bouzon-Gellenave (32063)
 Le Brouilh-Monbert (32065)
 Cabas-Loumassès (32067)
 Cahuzac-sur-Adour (32070)
 Castelnau-d'Anglès (32077)
 Castelnavet (32081)
 Castex (32086)
 Caumont (32093)
 Cazaux-Villecomtal (32099)
 Chélan (32103)
 Clermont-Pouyguillès (32104)
 Corneillan (32108)
 Couloumé-Mondebat (32109)
 Courties (32111)
 Cuélas (32114)
 Duffort (32116)
 Durban (32118)
 Esclassan-Labastide (32122)
 Estampes (32126)
 Estipouy (32128)
 Faget-Abbatial (32130)
 Fustérouau (32135)
 Galiax (32136)
 Gée-Rivière (32145)
 Goux (32151)
 Haget (32152)
 Haulies (32153)
 Idrac-Respaillès (32156)
 L'Isle-de-Noé (32159)
 Izotges (32161)
 Jû-Belloc (32163)
 Juillac (32164)
 Laas (32167)
 Labarthe (32169)
 Labarthète (32170)
 Labéjan (32172)
 Ladevèze-Rivière (32174)
 Ladevèze-Ville (32175)
 Lagarde-Hachan (32177)
 Laguian-Mazous (32181)
 Lalanne-Arqué (32185)
 Lamaguère (32186)
 Lamazère (32187)
 Lannux (32192)
 Lasséran (32200)
 Lasserrade (32199)
 Lasseube-Propre (32201)
 Laveraët (32205)
 Lelin-Lapujolle (32209)
 Loubersan (32215)
 Lourties-Monbrun (32216)
 Louslitges (32217)
 Loussous-Débat (32218)
 Malabat (32225)
 Manas-Bastanous (32226)
 Manent-Montané (32228)
 Marciac (32233)
 Margouët-Meymes (32235)
 Marseillan (32238)
 Mascaras (32240)
 Masseube (32242)
 Maulichères (32244)
 Maumusson-Laguian (32245)
 Meilhan (32250)
 Miélan (32252)
 Miramont-d'Astarac (32254)
 Mirande (32256)
 Monbardon (32260)
 Moncassin (32263)
 Monclar-sur-Losse (32265)
 Moncorneil-Grazan (32266)
 Monferran-Plavès (32267)
 Monlaur-Bernet (32272)
 Monlezun (32273)
 Monpardiac (32275)
 Montaut (32278)
 Mont-d'Astarac (32280)
 Mont-de-Marrast (32281)
 Montégut-Arros (32283)
 Montesquiou (32285)
 Monties (32287)
 Mouchès (32293)
 Orbessan (32300)
 Ornézan (32302)
 Pallanne (32303)
 Panassac (32304)
 Plaisance (32319)
 Ponsampère (32323)
 Ponsan-Soubiran (32324)
 Pouydraguin (32325)
 Pouylebon (32326)
 Pouy-Loubrin (32327)
 Préchac-sur-Adour (32330)
 Projan (32333)
 Ricourt (32342)
 Riscle (32344)
 Sabazan (32354)
 Sadeillan (32355)
 Saint-Arroman (32361)
 Saint-Aunix-Lengros (32362)
 Saint-Blancard (32365)
 Saint-Christaud (32367)
 Sainte-Aurence-Cazaux (32363)
 Sainte-Dode (32373)
 Saint-Élix-Theux (32375)
 Saint-Germé (32378)
 Saint-Jean-le-Comtal (32381)
 Saint-Justin (32383)
 Saint-Martin (32389)
 Saint-Maur (32393)
 Saint-Médard (32394)
 Saint-Michel (32397)
 Saint-Mont (32398)
 Saint-Ost (32401)
 Samaran (32409)
 Sansan (32411)
 Sarcos (32413)
 Sarragachies (32414)
 Sarraguzan (32415)
 Sauviac (32419)
 Scieurac-et-Flourès (32422)
 Ségos (32424)
 Seissan (32426)
 Sembouès (32427)
 Sère (32430)
 Tachoires (32438)
 Tarsac (32439)
 Tasque (32440)
 Termes-d'Armagnac (32443)
 Tieste-Uragnoux (32445)
 Tillac (32446)
 Tourdun (32450)
 Traversères (32454)
 Troncens (32455)
 Vergoignan (32460)
 Verlus (32461)
 Viella (32463)
 Villecomtal-sur-Arros (32464)
 Viozan (32466)

History

The arrondissement of Mirande was created in 1800. At the January 2017 reorganisation of the arrondissements of Gers, it gained 21 communes from the arrondissement of Auch, and it lost five communes to the arrondissement of Auch.

As a result of the reorganisation of the cantons of France which came into effect in 2015, the borders of the cantons are no longer related to the borders of the arrondissements. The cantons of the arrondissement of Mirande were, as of January 2015:

 Aignan
 Marciac
 Masseube
 Miélan
 Mirande
 Montesquiou
 Plaisance
 Riscle

References

Mirande